Golf at the 2005 Southeast Asian Games took place in The Country Club, Canlubang, Calamba, Laguna, Philippines.

Men's division was held from 1–5 December and the women's division was held from 2–5 December.

Summary

Medal winners

External links
Southeast Asian Games Official Results

2005 Southeast Asian Games events
Southeast Asian Games, 2005
Southeast Asian
2005